G3-a (also G3a, G3 c, GIIIa) is one of the three pyramid companions Pyramid of Menkaure. It is located on the south side of the  Menkaure pyramid in the Giza Necropolis. It is the easternmost of the three pyramids of the queens. The pyramid was built during the Fourth Dynasty of Egypt, presumably for one of the wives of Menkaure. The American archaeologist George Andrew Reisner was "confident" that the structure housed Khamerernebty II, but this is far from certain.

The structure has a T-shaped chamber carved out of the bedrock, to which an entrance open on the north face of the structure. The American archaeologist Mark Lehner argues this akin to the layout of a satellite or ka pyramid. The fact that the structure once contained a pink granite sarcophagus, however, has led scholars to speculate that it may have been reused as a queen's burial tomb, or that it served as a chapel where the body of Menkaure was mummified.

See also 
 List of Egyptian pyramids
 Pyramid G3-b
 Pyramid G3-c

References

Bibliography 
 
 
  (Note: This is the second unpublished follow-up to Reisner's work A History of the Giza Necropolis Vol. I, published by Harvard University Press)

External links 
 Pyramid G3-a at Digital Giza

Pyramids in Egypt
Pyramids of the Fourth Dynasty of Egypt